Mao Yuanxin (born 14 February 1941), also known as Li Shi, is a former Chinese politician. As the nephew of Chairman Mao Zedong, he acted as the liaison between Mao and the Communist Party's Central Committee in Mao's ailing years, when he was no longer able to regularly attend political functions.  He was considered an ally to the radical political faction known as the Gang of Four.  He was arrested soon after Mao's death after a political struggle ensued, and was sentenced to prison.

Biography
Born on 14 February 1941 in Dihua (now Urumqi), Mao Yuanxin is the son of Mao Zemin, a younger brother of Mao Zedong. Mao Zemin had joined the Communist Party in 1922 and was executed by a warlord in 1943. Sheng Shicai, governor of Xinjiang, had been aligned to the Chinese Communist Party and had at first welcomed Mao Zemin, but switched allegiance after Germany invaded the Soviet Union.  Mao Yuanxin's mother was also arrested. After Mao Yuanxin's mother remarried, he was brought up as part of his uncle's family.

In 1960, Mao Yuanxin was admitted to Tsinghua University, then transferred to the PLA Institute of Military Engineering and became politically important during the Cultural Revolution.  In 1973 he became party secretary of Liaoning province and political commissar of Shenyang Military Region in 1974. By that time he had allied himself with Jiang Qing. In Shenyang he participated the Cultural Revolution, including leading a march of Red Guards to a military instillation in the Northeast. By 1975, when Mao was no longer able to attend Central Committee meetings on a regular basis, Mao Yuanxin became the chairman's liaison with the Politburo, and he contributed to the temporary fall of Deng Xiaoping in 1976, as well as a series of other political manuoevers of the Gang of Four. 

During Mao Zedong's final years, Mao Yuanxin had a close relationship with the Gang of Four. Some historians believe that Mao Yuanxin relayed news to Mao that the April 1976 "Tiananmen Incident" was planned by Deng Xiaoping, which resulted in Mao's final break with Deng before the latter's purge.  He was arrested along with other of their supporters following Mao's death in October 1976, and was sentenced to seventeen years in prison by court martial.

Mao Yuanxin faded from public view after the end of the Cultural Revolution. He was released from prison in October 1993 after having served his 17 years sentence. He changed his name to Li Shi and worked in the Shanghai Automobile Industry Quality Testing Institute as a technician. He retired in 2001, and receives a pension in accordance with his "senior technician" qualification. He also receives treatment as a "martyr's family member" because of his father's manner of death.

In October 2012, Mao Yuanxin visited Xichuan County in Henan to tour the progress of the South–North Water Transfer Project. Mao Yuanxin also attended the 120 year commemoration of his uncle's birth in 2013, held in Hunan Province.

Personal life
Mao Yuanxin is married to Quan Xiufeng, a former factory worker. They live in Shanghai and have one daughter, Li Li, born in January 1977.

References

External links
 Role mentioned in the obituary of Ren Zhongyi
 Role mentioned in 'Rise and Fall of Deng Xiaoping' in an on-line history of the Cultural Revolution

1941 births
Living people
Chinese Communist Party politicians from Xinjiang
Anti-revisionists
People of the Cultural Revolution
Mao Zedong family
Tsinghua University alumni
Chinese politicians convicted of crimes
People from Ürümqi
Political commissars of the Shenyang Military Region